Bonaventure is a provincial electoral district in the Gaspésie–Îles-de-la-Madeleine region of Quebec, Canada that elects members to the National Assembly of Quebec. It is located on the southern shore of the Gaspé Peninsula and encompasses several towns along the Baie des Chaleurs and the New Brunswick border. It notably includes the municipalities of Chandler, Carleton-sur-Mer, New Richmond, Paspébiac, Maria and Bonaventure.

It was originally created for the 1867 election (and an electoral district of that name existed earlier in the Legislative Assembly of the Province of Canada and the Legislative Assembly of Lower Canada).

In the change from the 2001 to the 2011 electoral map, it gained Chandler from Gaspé electoral district.

Linguistic demographics
Francophone: 84.4%
Anglophone: 13.8%
Allophone: 1.8%

Members of the Legislative Assembly / National Assembly

Election results

* Result compared to Action démocratique

References

External links
Information
 Elections Quebec

Election results
 Election results (National Assembly)
 Election results (QuébecPolitique)

Maps
 2011 map (PDF)
 2001 map (Flash)
2001–2011 changes (Flash)
1992–2001 changes (Flash)
 Electoral map of Gaspésie–Îles-de-la-Madeleine region
 Quebec electoral map, 2011

Carleton-sur-Mer
Quebec provincial electoral districts